Emilio Nicolás Oribe (April 13, 1893 –  May 24, 1975), was a Uruguayan poet, essayist, philosopher, and doctor.

A professor at the University of the Republic, Uruguay, Oribe was dean of the university's Faculty of Humanities and Sciences and a member of the Uruguayan Academy of Letters.

As a poet, he developed an avant-garde style influenced by Ultraism.

As a philosopher, he was a strong idealist, and often expressed himself using aphorisms.

Notable works

Poetry 

Alucinaciones de belleza (1912)
El nardo del ánfora (1915)
El castillo interior (1917)
El halconero astral (1919)
El nunca usado mar (1922)
La colina del pájaro rojo (1925)

Essays 

Poética y plástica (1930)
Teoría del «nous» (1934)
El mito y el logos (1945)
Ars magna (1960)

External links
 Poetry and poetics in Emilio Oribe (Spanish)
 Biography in Biografías y Vidas  (Spanish)

1893 births
1975 deaths
People from Melo, Uruguay
Uruguayan people of Basque descent
20th-century Uruguayan physicians
20th-century Uruguayan poets
Uruguayan male poets
Uruguayan essayists
Members of the Uruguayan Academy of Language
Male essayists
20th-century essayists
20th-century Uruguayan male writers
20th-century Uruguayan philosophers